Albay—a small gunboat built at Cavite, Luzon, Philippine Islands, for the Spanish colonial government of the Philippines—was laid down in 1885 and completed in 1886. However, some sources hold that this vessel was constructed at Shanghai by the Hong Kong and Whampoa Dock Co. In any case, she operated in the Philippine Archipelago until captured by American forces there during the Spanish–American War.

On 21 May 1899, Ens. Michael J. McCormack was detached from the protected cruiser  and assumed command of Albay when she was placed in commission later that day. During the next few years, the small gunboat was intermittently in and out of commission as she performed patrol duty and helped to survey rivers and bays in the islands. She also served at Cavite as a ferry. On 1 June 1899, Ens. William Harrison Standley—who would later rise to the then nonexistent position of Chief of Naval Operations and subsequently would serve as the American Ambassador to the Soviet Union during World War II—relieved McCormack in command of the gunboat.

Placed out of commission at Cavite on 13 February 1904, Albay was still laid up there when her name was struck from the Navy list on 11 February 1905. She was sold on 8 June 1906 to Messrs. Grant and Co., of Manila

References
 
 NavSource Online: Gunboat Photo Archive Albay

1886 ships
Gunboats of the United States Navy
Ships built in the Philippines